Matriz de Camaragibe is a municipality located in the Brazilian state of Alagoas.

Its population is 24,634 (2020) and its area is 330 km².

References

Municipalities in Alagoas